The Asia/Oceania Zone will be one of the three regional zones of the 2019 Davis Cup.

In the Asia/Oceania Zone there are four different tiers, called groups. The winners of the Group I ties in September will earn a place in the 2020 Davis Cup Qualifiers, while the remaining nations in Groups I and II will be allocated a place within their region depending on their position in the Nations Ranking.

Participating nations
<onlyinclude>

Seeds: 

Remaining nations:

Results summary

Results

Pakistan vs. India

Lebanon vs. Uzbekistan

China vs. South Korea

References

External links

Asia/Oceania Zone Group I
Davis Cup Asia/Oceania Zone
Davis Cup Asia/Oceania Zone Group I